Reporter is a German television series.

See also
List of German television series

External links

Television series about journalism
1989 German television series debuts
1989 German television series endings
German-language television shows
Das Erste original programming
Grimme-Preis for fiction winners